Sir Stuart Knill, 1st Baronet (11 April 1824 – 19 November 1898) was a London businessman and Lord Mayor of London.

He was born the son of John Knill, of Blackheath, London and succeeded his father as proprietor of Messrs. John Knill and Co., wharfingers and warehouse-keepers, of London Bridge. His step-sister was Jane Knill, the third wife of the architect Augustus Pugin.

In 1885 he was elected Alderman for the ward of Bridge Within, became Sheriff of the City of London for 1889–90 and Lord Mayor of London for 1892–93. As a devout Catholic, only the second to be selected as Mayor since the Reformation, he had certain difficulties in coping with the traditions of the office caused by his refusal to enter a Protestant church. He was nevertheless given the honour of a baronetcy in 1893 to celebrate the marriage of the Duke and Duchess of York. In 1897 he transferred his aldermanry to the adjacent ward of Bridge Without to make room for his son Sir (John) Stuart Knill, 2nd Baronet, who became Lord Mayor in turn in 1909.

He was a member of the Plumbers’ Company and was also on the Court of the Goldsmiths’ Company. He was created him a Knight of St. Gregory by the Pope and an officer of the Order of St Leopold by the King of the Belgians.

He died in 1898. He had married Mary, the daughter of Charles Rowland Parker of Blackheath and had several children, including his heir and four daughters.

References

1824 births
1898 deaths
British businesspeople
Sheriffs of the City of London
19th-century lord mayors of London
19th-century English politicians
Knights of St. Gregory the Great
Baronets in the Baronetage of the United Kingdom
English Roman Catholics
19th-century British businesspeople